John Collett may refer to:

 John A. Collett (1908–1942), namesake of the USS Collett, a World War II-era destroyer
 John Collett (artist) (1725–1780), English artist
 John Collett (MP) (1798–1856), Irish Whig politician